René Bezard (1920–2008) was a French film producer and mining engineer.  From 1950 to 1963 he was managing director of Pathé having previously overseen the Franstudio group of film studios. He later returned to his career in mining and electronics.

Selected filmography
 Cadet Rousselle (1954)
 Rififi (1955)
 Deadlier Than the Male (1956)
 Mannequins of Paris (1956)
 Les Lavandières du Portugal (1957)
 Captain Blood (1960)
 Le Tracassin (1961)

References

Bibliography
 Kinnard, Roy & Crnkovich, Tony . Italian Sword and Sandal Films, 1908–1990. McFarland, 2017.
 Palmer, Tim &  Michael, Charlie. Directory of World Cinema: France. Intellect Books, 2013.

External links

1920 births
2008 deaths
People from Le Mans
French film producers
French mining engineers